Femina Miss India Delhi  is a beauty pageant in India that annually selects three winners to compete nationally . The winner of Femina Miss India Delhi vies in Miss India. It is organized by Femina, a women's magazine published by Bennett, Coleman & Co. Ltd.

Final results

Sub Contest Awards

Judges
Simran Kaur Mundi: Femina Miss India Universe 2008
Vanya Mishra: Femina Miss India World 2012
Khushwant Singh
Pooja Talwar

References

Live Updates Pond's Femina Miss India 2013 Contest

2013 beauty pageants in India
Femina Miss India
Female models from Delhi